The ITF Women's Circuit is the second tier tour for women's professional tennis organised by the International Tennis Federation, and is the tier below the WTA Tour. In 2003, the ITF Women's circuit included tournaments with prize money ranging from $10,000 to $75,000. In addition to the traditional tournament format, there were also three four-week circuits each worth $40,000 in prize money.

The ITF world champions in 2003 were Justine Henin-Hardenne (senior singles), Virginia Ruano Pascual / Paola Suárez (senior doubles), Kirsten Flipkens (junior singles) and Andrea Hlaváčková (junior doubles).

Tournament breakdown by region

*Includes information for events in Central America and the Caribbean

Singles titles by nation

This list displays only the top 22 nations in terms of singles titles wins.

Sources
List of ITF World Champions
ITF prize money (1983–2008) 
ITF Pro Circuit Titles Won By Nations Players in 2003

References

External links
International Tennis Federation (ITF) official website

 
ITF Women's World Tennis Tour
ITF Circuit
2003 in women's tennis